Solwold is a surname. Notable people with the surname include:

Austin Aries (born 1978), ring name of American professional wrestler and voice actor Daniel Healy Solwold
Mike Solwold (born 1977), American football player